Egersund is a town in Eigersund municipality in Rogaland county, Norway. The town is situated along a strait which separates the mainland from the island of Eigerøya. From 1838 until 1964, the town was also an independent municipality.

Egersund has one of the best natural harbours in Norway, and it used to be the largest harbour in Norway when measured in quantity of fish brought in each year (surpassed by Ålesund in 2006). Several internationally known companies have divisions here, like Navico (earlier Robertson autopilots) and Jeppesen Norway formerly C-MAP Norway (producer of electronic sea-maps). In addition, the Aker Solutions corporation owns and runs a large installation here which specializes in the building of parts for oil platforms. Most of the industry is related to the sea and to boats.

History

Early history
People have lived around the area of Egersund since the Stone Age. There are several places around Egersund where one can find ruins of settlements dating back to the age of migrations in Norway (400–600 BC).

Middle Ages
There used to be a church here, the Church of St. Mary, mentioned in 1292 in a privilege of indulgence issued in Rome on 5 February 1292 by Pope Nicholas IV as Ecclesia beatæ Mariæ de Eikundarsund. It was the first church in Egersund, and was the parish church of the St. Mary parish. It is believed to have been located where the present Egersund Church stands today. Old folklore from Egersund also says that before the Church of St. Mary, an altar where people sacrificed to the old Norse gods was placed here, but this has not been verified from any sources except old stories.

There was also a chapel, the chapel of St. Laurenti, mentioned in a letter issued on 5 February 1308 as Ecclesia beati Laurentii de Eikundarsund, where Pope Clement V gives King Håkon V Magnusson extensive privileges concerning the King's 14 chapels (including the chapel of St. Laurenti), which was founded by himself or his father, King Magnus Lagabøte, and his grandfather, King Håkon Håkonson. Since these chapels often were built on the king's estates, it is presumed to have been on grounds owned by the Husaby estate. An old tradition says it was located at what is now "Strandgata 43", but the exact position is somewhat uncertain.

17th and 18th centuries

In 1623 the old church (probably the Church of St. Mary) was demolished and a new Egersund Church was erected. This building still stands today.

On 18 July 1798, the village of Egersund was established as a ladested with its own customs office.

19th and 20th centuries
The ladested of Egersund was established as a municipality on 1 January 1838 under the new formannskapsdistrikt law.  This effectively gave Egersund the municipal self-government that was now uniformly given to all areas of Norway.

In 1843, a fire destroyed two thirds of the town, allowing a major redesign of streets.  In 1847, Johan Feyer founded A/S Egersunds Fayancefabriks Co., which became the town's major employer until closing in 1979.

On 7 July 1859, there was another major fire, and another again on 20 October 1862.  This was the last major town fire, since town planners finally understood wooden structures' vulnerability and reconstructed buildings using extra wide streets to prevent fires from spreading.

In 1878, the Jærensbanen railway line between Egersund and the city of Stavanger opened with Egersund Station in the center of the town.  In 1905, Egersund became the first town in Rogaland county to get electrical lighting.

On 9 April 1940, the German military invaded Norway and they occupy Egersund during World War II.  Egersund had strategic importance because of its harbour, as well as because the telegraph line between Norway and England was situated there. The Germans built large camps in the area. The occupation lasted until the end of the war.

In 1947, the town was growing rapidly, and an area of the neighboring municipality of Eigersund (population: 515) was transferred into the town of Egersund.

During the 1960s, the Schei Committee met in Norway to discuss the municipal structure in the nation.  It was decided that the number of cities and municipalities in Norway was too large, so on 1 January 1965, the town of Egersund lost its status as a self-governing municipality.  On that date, the following places were all merged into the new, larger municipality of Eigersund, with the town of Egersund as the new administrative centre:
the town of Egersund (population: 3,787)
the municipality of Eigersund (population: 4,664)
the municipality of Helleland (population: 851)
the Gyadalen and Grøsfjell areas in the municipality of Heskestad (population: 114)

Name 
The name "Egersund" derives from the Old Norse name for the strait between Eigerøya and the mainland, which was called Eikundarsund. The name of Eigerøy (Old Norse: Eikund) comes from the rich deposits of oak trees since the word eik is the Norwegian word for "oak". The name is among the oldest place names in Norway. It can already be found in the form Eikundarsund in the Norse saga of Olav the Holy, written by Icelandic author Snorri Sturlasson in the 13th century. From around the year 1000 Olav the Holy's fleet was here often. We can also find the name in texts and scaldic poems from Olav's saga.

Government
From 1838 until 1964 when the town of Egersund was an independent municipality, it was responsible for primary education (through 10th grade), outpatient health services, senior citizen services, unemployment and other social services, zoning, economic development, and municipal roads.  The municipality was governed by a municipal council of elected representatives, which in turn elects a mayor.

Municipal council
The municipal council  of Egersund was made up of representatives that were elected to four year terms.  The party breakdown of the final municipal council was as follows:

Transportation
Egersund has good connections by road to the cities of Stavanger and Kristiansand, via the European route E39 highway. There is also a more scenic coastal highway Norwegian County Road 44.  There is an hourly train connections northwards to Stavanger, while express and regional trains run southwards towards Kristiansand and Oslo.

Neighborhoods 
Egersund is divided up into several neighborhoods
Central (the central part of the town)  It is further divided into:
Damsgård, Havsøyne, Husabø, Lervige, Mosbekk, Årstad, Årstaddalen
Hestnes (far south part of the town)
Lagård (along the lake)
Rundevoll (central-south part of the town)
Sandbakkan (far southeastern part of the town)
Slettebø (far northeastern part of the town)
Søra Eigerøy / Søra Øyne (the south part of the island of Eigerøya)
Norda Eigerøy / Nora Øyne (the north part of the island of Eigerøya)
Tengs (far northwestern part of the town)
Åsan (near the bridge to Eigerøya)

Attractions
Dalane Folkemuseum: Museum of antiquities and history of Egersund.
Egersund Fayancemuseum: Museum of the glazed earthenware and porcelain made by Egersund Fayancefabrik from 1847 till 1979.
«Stoplesteinan». A rather unknown attraction, since it has not been embraced by the local tourist bureau. «Stoplesteinan» is a smaller «Stonehenge», i.e. a stone circle. It is more than a thousand years old, and believed by some to be almost 2000 years old. Who built it and why, is unknown. The stone circle is situated directly above Skårabrekkå just outside downtown Egersund.
Central Egersund houses some of the best preserved wood buildings in Norway. They are built in late Empire style, and most of the buildings are protected by law.
Magma UNESCO Global Geopark: open air geological park provided with facilities for outdoor activities to discover the amazing geological heritage of the area. From November 2017 in Egersund headquarter will be open to the public the geoVR virtual exhibition.
Home to the popular Trollpikken rock formation.

Notable residents

References

External links 

Egersund - Unofficial home page
Egersund - Official home page

 
Cities and towns in Norway
Former municipalities of Norway
Port cities and towns in Norway
Port cities and towns of the North Sea
Eigersund
1798 establishments in Norway
1964 disestablishments in Norway